The Fourteenth Nagaland Assembly is formed by the members elected in 2023 Nagaland Legislative Assembly election. Election were held in 59 constituencies on 27th February 2023 and 1 member elected unopposed from Akuluto. Votes were counted on 2nd March 2023.

History 
Incumbent North-East Democratic Alliance consists Bharatiya Janata Party and Nationalist Democratic Progressive Party again gained majority in the house after won 37 (25 NDPP + 12 BJP).

Hekani Jakhalu Kense from Dimapur III and Salhoutuonuo Kruse from Western Anagami constituencies became first women MLAs in the history of Nagaland. Both get elected as NDPP candidates.

Party wise distribution

Members

References 

Nagaland MLAs 2023–2028